Milone is a surname. Notable people with the surname include:

Anthony Michael Milone (1932–2018), American Roman Catholic bishop
Cesare Ferro Milone (1880–1934), Italian painter 
Eugene Milone (born 1939), American astronomer
Giuseppe Milone (born 1949), Italian sailor
Nathan Milone (born 1994), Australian rugby league footballer 
Paul Milone (born 1956), American soccer player
Tommy Milone (born 1987), American baseball player